Marine Fighter Attack Squadron 115 (VMFA-115) is a United States Marine Corps F/A-18 Hornet squadron. Officially nicknamed the "Silver Eagles" and on occasion Joe's Jokers after their first commanding officer Major Joe Foss, the squadron is based at Marine Corps Air Station Beaufort, South Carolina and falls under the command of  Marine Aircraft Group 31 (MAG-31) and the 2nd Marine Aircraft Wing (2nd MAW).  The squadron has seen combat during World War II, the Korean and Vietnam Wars and has deployed in support of Operation Iraqi Freedom with a final deployment in 2008 to Al Asad Airbase in western Iraq. The Squadron radio callsign is "Blade".

Mission
Intercept and destroy enemy aircraft under all-weather conditions and attack and destroy surface targets.

History

World War II
Marine Fighting Squadron 115 (VMF-115) was organized on July 1, 1943 at Marine Corps Air Station Santa Barbara, California, as a F4U Corsair squadron.  One of the Marine Corps most famous aces, Major Joseph Foss assumed command 16 days later.  The squadron gained the nickname "Joe's Jokers", and in May 1944 joined the Pacific campaign.  VMF-115 was a contributor to the American victory in the Philippines providing close air support, fighter cover, and deep air strikes in Mindanao and the Sulu Archipelago.  With over 18,000 flight hours during 5,856 combat sorties, VMF-115 was credited with shooting down 6½ enemy aircraft while losing 28 aircraft with nine pilots killed in action.

To protect U.S. interests after the war and support Marines supervising the surrender of Japan, the squadron deployed to Peking, China.  Communist troops began patterns of hostility leading to convoy coverage and "air presence" missions.  31 months after initial deployment, VMF-115 left the Pacific theater.

Korean War

The squadron then deployed to Pohang, Korea, for combat operation in February 1952. In late-June 1952 they participated in the attack on the Sui-ho Dam. Throughout the Korean War, VMF-115 expended more ordnance than any other Marine jet fighter squadron. A total of 15,350 flight hours were logged on 9,250 combat sorties with a price of 19 aircraft lost. Six pilots were lost with their aircraft in a single day and a total of 14 pilots were killed in action. Close air support was provided by VMF-115 in battles such as Bunker Hill, The Hook, Reno, Carson-Elko, Vegas, Berlin, East Berlin, and the Marines famous battle at the Chosin Reservoir.

In the spring of 1957, the squadron received the Marine Corps' first Douglas F4D-1 Skyrays were redesignated VMF(AW)-115 and deployed to MCAF Mojave for the next six months for testing.  Between 1957 and 1964, the squadron was usually based at MCAS Cherry Point, North Carolina. From 19 April 1962 to 27 August 1962 the squadron was deployed aboard the aircraft carrier USS Independence (CVA-62) as part of Carrier Air Group Seven (CVG-7) to the Mediterranean Sea.  From October 1962 to February 1963 the squadron was deployed to Naval Station Guantanamo Bay, Cuba in support of the Cuban Missile Crisis.

Vietnam War

In 1964/65 the squadron transitioned the McDonnell F-4B Phantom II and was redesignated VMFA-115. The "Able Eagles" were deployed to Da Nang Air Base, Republic of Vietnam on October 14, 1965. During the Vietnam War, VMFA-115 flew more than 34,000 combat sorties, providing close air support for Marines during such battles as the Tet Offensive, Battle of Hue, Battle of Khe Sahn, and Task Force Delta.  The squadron was awarded the Hanson Trophy in 1971 by the Commandant of the Marine Corps. In March 1971 VMFA-115 was relocated to Iwakuni, Japan.  On April 6, 1972 the squadron flew into Da Nang Air Base to support operations against the North Vietnamese Easter Offensive.  On July 16, 1972 the squadron moved its operations to Royal Thai Air Base Nam Phong, Thailand and began flying combat sorties the next day. The squadron continued to fly close air support sorties in addition to playing a key fighter role in Operation Linebacker missions over North Vietnam.  For its efforts supporting operations in Vietnam, VMFA-115 was awarded the Marine Corps Aviation Association's Robert M. Hanson Award as the top fighter attack squadron in the Marine Corps for 1972.

Post Vietnam
During this cruise VMFA-115 participated in Cold War missions such as intercepting and escorting various Soviet aircraft.

After flying Phantoms for more than 20 years, VMFA-115 began the transition to the F/A-18A Hornet on January 1, 1985, and officially stood up with 14 aircraft on August 16, 1985. The following year, the squadron became officially known as the "Silver Eagles.”

In July 1987, VMFA-115 returned to the Western Pacific to participate in the Unit Deployment Program (UDP) at Marine Corps Air Station Iwakuni, Japan. The squadron was recognized for superior maintenance, receiving the Secretary of Defense Phoenix Award for Maintenance Excellence, and earned the Hanson Award as Marine Corps Fighter Squadron of the Year for both 1987 and 1988. This was the first time a Marine Fighter Squadron had won the Hanson Award two consecutive years.

In 1989, VMFA-115 returned to the Philippines and supported government forces during a coup attempt there. The squadron flew armed combat air patrol and escort missions, helping to stabilize the situation. The squadron’s efforts were recognized again as the coveted Hanson Award became a “Silver Eagle” possession in 1990 for the third time in four years. During the years from 1991 to 2000, the “Silver Eagles” conducted numerous six-month deployments in support of the 1st Marine Aircraft Wing as part of the Western Pacific Unit Deployment Program (UDP).

Global War on Terrorism

Nearing the end of 2001, the squadron was once again designated a carrier squadron. This coincided with the first delivery of the F/A-18A+ aircraft modification. After qualifying all personnel for carrier operations the squadron deployed with Carrier Air Wing 3 (CVW-3) aboard USS Harry S. Truman in October 2002. In March 2003, the Silver Eagles fought against Iraqi forces as part of Operation Iraqi Freedom, delivering more than 150 tons of ordnance. In October 2004, the squadron again deployed with CVW-3 aboard Truman for Operation Iraqi Freedom, providing close air support and overhead security in support of Iraq’s historic democratic elections.

In July 2006, VMFA-115 returned to the Western Pacific for the first time since 2000 to serve under 1st MAW/III Marine Expeditionary Force for a UDP deployment.  The Silver Eagles flew training sorties at various locations in Japan and squadron Marines also spent a month at Osan Air Base in South Korea.

In February 2008, VMFA-115 deployed to Al Asad Airbase, Iraq in support of Operation Iraqi Freedom (OIF) where they were the Marine Corps’ first forward-air-controller capable, single-seat F/A-18 Hornet squadron to deploy to Al Asad.
The Squadron returned to MCAS Beaufort on September 17, 2008.  In September 2009, the squadron transferred to Marine Aircraft Group 12 as part of the Unit Deployment Program at MCAS Iwakuni with a full complement of twelve F/A-18A+ Hornets.
  They returned to the States on March 1, 2010 after a seven-month deployment where they supported operations in Okinawa, Thailand, Korea the Philippines and Brunei.  In 2013, they deployed to Isa Air Base, Bahrain, from March until October, returning to MCAS Beaufort upon completion.  They once again transferred to Marine Aircraft Group 12, MCAS Iwakuni, Japan under the Unit Deployment Program from July through December, 2014.

On December 7, 2016 an FA-18C+ of the squadron crashed into the sea off Okinawa. The pilot, Captain Jake Fredrick, ejected but did not survive. His body was recovered by the Japan Maritime Self-Defense Force.

As of the 2019 Aviation Plan, the Silver Eagles will become the third Marine F-35C squadron, scheduled to transition in FY2023. (Subject to change)

Unit Awards
  Presidential Unit Citation Streamer with two Bronze Stars
  Navy Unit Commendation Streamer with one Silver Star and one Bronze Star
  Meritorious Unit Commendation Streamer with four Bronze Stars
  China Service Streamer
  Asiatic/Pacific Campaign Streamer with one Silver Star
  World War II Victory Streamer
  National Defense Service Streamer with three Bronze Stars
  Korean Service Streamer with four Bronze Stars
  Armed Forces Expeditionary Streamer with two Bronze Stars
  Vietnam Service Streamer with two Silver and four Bronze Stars
  Global War on Terror Expeditionary Streamer
  Global War on Terror Service Streamer
  Armed Forces Service Streamer
  Philippine Liberation Streamer with two Bronze Stars
  Philippine Presidential Unit Citation Streamer
  Korean Presidential Unit Citation Streamer
  Vietnam Cross of Gallantry with Palm Streamer
  Vietnam Meritorious Unit Citation Civil Actions Streamer

See also

United States Marine Corps Aviation
Organization of the United States Marine Corps
List of active United States Marine Corps aircraft squadrons

Notes

References

Bibliography

Web

External links
VMFA-115's official website
Squadron News

Fighter attack squadrons of the United States Marine Corps
FS0115